Jan Ritzema Bos (25 July 1850, in Groningen – 7 April 1928, in Wageningen) was a Dutch plant pathologist and first director of the Willie Commelin Scholten Foundation and founder of the Plant Protection Service in 1899 in Amsterdam. He carried out application-oriented research and was nominated as Director of the newly founded 'Institute of Phytopathology' (subsequently re-named the Phytopathological Service) at Wageningen. Here Ritzema-Bos continued with the 'Plant Protection Service', the Netherlands Society of Plant Pathology and the 'Tijdschrift over Plantenziekten' which later became The Netherlands Journal of Plant Pathology and in 1994 was continued as the European Journal of Plant Pathology, published under the aegis of the European Foundation for Plant Pathology. He was succeeded by Johanna Westerdijk (1883-1961) as the new director of the WCS-Laboratory in 1906. 

He was the son of Pieter Pieters Bos (1812-1891) and Geessien Jans Ritzema (1823-1903), and was named after his grandfather Jan Ritzema. His brother was Hemmo Bos, author and lecturer at the agricultural college in Wageningen.

Books
 Nederlandsche Planten - Th. Nieuwenhuis, L. Klaver & Dr.J. Ritzema Bos - 55 loose lithographed plates (S.L. van Looy, Amsterdam 1905) 
 Tierische Schädlinge und Nützlinge für Ackerbau, Viehzucht, Wald- und Gartenbau; Lebensformen, Vorkommen, Einfluß und die Maßregeln zu Vertilgung und Schutz. Praktisches Handbuch - Jan Ritzema Bos (Berlin, Paul Parey, 1891)

References

External links
 
 

1850 births
1928 deaths
Dutch biologists
19th-century Dutch biologists
20th-century Dutch biologists
19th-century Dutch botanists
20th-century Dutch botanists
Dutch phytopathologists
Scientists from Groningen (city)
University of Groningen alumni
Academic staff of the University of Amsterdam
Academic staff of Wageningen University and Research